Didier Robert (born 26 April 1964) is a French politician who is a member of the Republicans party. He represents the island of Réunion,  and was a member of the Union for a Popular Movement.

Robert has served as President of the Regional Council of Réunion since 26 March 2010, succeeding Paul Vergès.

References

1964 births
Living people
Presidents of the Regional Council of Réunion
Members of the Regional Council of Réunion
Politicians of Réunion
Sciences Po Aix alumni
The Republicans (France) politicians
Deputies of the 13th National Assembly of the French Fifth Republic
Senators of Réunion
People from Saint-Pierre, Réunion
Members of Parliament for Réunion